In computing, a distributed file system (DFS) or network file system is any file system that allows access to files from multiple hosts sharing via a computer network. This makes it possible for multiple users on multiple machines to share files and storage resources.

Distributed file systems differ in their performance, mutability of content, handling of concurrent writes, handling of permanent or temporary loss of nodes or storage, and their policy of storing content.

Locally managed

FOSS

Proprietary

Remote access

Comparison
Some researchers have made a functional and experimental analysis of several distributed file systems including HDFS, Ceph, Gluster, Lustre and old (1.6.x) version of MooseFS, although this document is from 2013 and a lot of information are outdated (e.g. MooseFS had no HA for Metadata Server at that time).

The cloud based remote distributed storage from major vendors have different APIs and different consistency models.

See also
Distributed file system
List of file systems, the Distributed file systems section

References

Network file systems
Distributed file systems